Orrin Miller may refer to:
Orrin Larrabee Miller (1856–1926), member of the United States House of Representatives from Kansas
Orrin P. Miller (1858–1918), member of the presiding bishopric of The Church of Jesus Christ of Latter-day Saints